The David and Catherine Driver Farm is a historic farmstead in rural Rockingham County, Virginia, near Timberville.  The main house, a -story wood-frame structure, was built c. 1845 and has Greek Revival styling.  It was extended in the 1880s, giving it a T-shape and adding Victorian details such as  bull's eye window in the front gable.  The farm's most notable building is a c. 1839 barn, a rare survivor of the Valley Campaigns of 1864 through the area, in which the Union Army under General Philip Sheridan destroyed most barns.

The farm was listed on the National Register of Historic Places in 2007.

See also
National Register of Historic Places listings in Rockingham County, Virginia

References

National Register of Historic Places in Rockingham County, Virginia
Greek Revival houses in Virginia
Victorian architecture in Virginia
Commercial buildings completed in 1839
Timberville, Virginia